Cookeolus is a genus of marine ray-finned fishes from the family Priacanthidae, the bigeyes. It contains one extant species and one extinct species.

Species
The following species are classified within the genus Cookeolus:

Cookeolus japonicus (Cuvier, 1829) – Longfinned bullseye
†Cookeolus spinolacrymatus Kon & Yoshino, 1997 

† means extinct.

References

Priacanthidae
Ray-finned fish genera
Marine fish genera
Taxa named by Henry Weed Fowler